James “Jim” Manganello  is a retired American soccer midfielder who spent four seasons with the Boston Bulldogs in the USL A-League.

Youth
Manganello attended Wheaton College where he was a 1997 Third Team and a 1998 Second Team All American soccer player.

Professional
On February 6, 1999, the MetroStars selected Manganello in the third round (twenty-ninth overall) of the 1999 MLS College Draft.  He was injured early in the season.  The MetroStars released him on June 29, 1999.  In 2000, Manganello played for the Boston Bulldogs of the USL A-League.  He played for the Bulldogs through 2003.

References

External links 
 

1976 births
Living people
American soccer players
Boston Bulldogs (soccer) players
Cape Cod Crusaders players
New York Red Bulls players
A-League (1995–2004) players
USL Second Division players
Soccer players from Massachusetts
New York Red Bulls draft picks
Association football midfielders
Wheaton College (Massachusetts) alumni